National Film School may refer to:
 Leon Schiller National Film School, known as Łódź Film School, Poland
 National Film and Television School in Beaconsfield, England
 National Film School of Denmark
 National Film School of Ireland, within  Dún Laoghaire Institute of Art, Design and Technology (IADT)